Labouriat is a small town and rural commune in the Assa-Zag Province of the Guelmim-Oued Noun region of Morocco. At the time of the 2014 census, the commune had a total population of 2,128 people.

References

Populated places in Guelmim-Oued Noun